Souleuvre en Bocage (literally Souleuvre in Bocage) is a commune in the department of Calvados, northwestern France. The municipality was established on 1 January 2016 by merger of the former communes of Beaulieu, Le Bény-Bocage (the seat), Bures-les-Monts, Campeaux, Carville, Étouvy, La Ferrière-Harang, La Graverie, Malloué, Montamy, Mont-Bertrand, Montchauvet, Le Reculey, Saint-Denis-Maisoncelles, Sainte-Marie-Laumont, Saint-Martin-des-Besaces, Saint-Martin-Don, Saint-Ouen-des-Besaces, Saint-Pierre-Tarentaine and Le Tourneur.

Population

See also 
Communes of the Calvados department

References 

Communes of Calvados (department)
Populated places established in 2016
2016 establishments in France